Manuel Silva (born 8 October 1978) is a Portuguese middle-distance runner. He competed in the 3000 metres steeplechase at the 2000 Summer Olympics and the 2004 Summer Olympics.

References

External links
 

1978 births
Living people
Athletes (track and field) at the 2000 Summer Olympics
Athletes (track and field) at the 2004 Summer Olympics
Portuguese male middle-distance runners
Portuguese male steeplechase runners
Olympic athletes of Portugal
Place of birth missing (living people)